Kuala Selangor may refer to:
Kuala Selangor District
Kuala Selangor (federal constituency), represented in the Dewan Rakyat
Kuala Selangor (state constituency), formerly represented in the Selangor State Council (1955–59)